Backford Hall is a country house in the village of Backford, Cheshire, England.  It was built in 1863 on the site of earlier halls, and was designed by John Cunningham.  Its style is described as "exuberant Elizabethan, Jacobean and Bohemian Rococo". The authors of the Buildings of England series describe the north front as being "wildly over-egged". The house is constructed in brick with slate roofs. 

Since 1946 it has been used as offices by Cheshire County Council, and in 2012 its sale was agreed for residential development if planning approval was granted. Planning permission was granted in 2014 and the first residents moved into one of the new houses in 2016. The house is recorded in the National Heritage List for England as a designated Grade II listed building.

See also

Listed buildings in Backford

References

Further reading

Country houses in Cheshire
Houses completed in 1863
Grade II listed buildings in Cheshire
Grade II listed houses
John Cunningham buildings